The Novotel Taipei Taoyuan International Airport is a hotel in Dayuan District, Taoyuan City, Taiwan. It consists of 360 rooms. It is accessible from Airport Hotel Station of Taoyuan Airport MRT.

History
Opened in November 2009, the hotel was the first venture of Accor in Taiwan. On 25 June 2014, a meeting between the Minister of the Mainland Affairs Council of the Republic of China, and Zhang Zhijun, the Minister of the Taiwan Affairs Office of the People's Republic of China took place at the hotel.

See also
Monarch Skyline Hotel
Sheraton Taoyuan Hotel

References

Hotel buildings completed in 2009
2009 establishments in Taiwan
Hotels established in 2009
Taipei Taoyuan
Hotels in Taoyuan